The Olympic Games are an international multi-sport event featuring both summer and winter sports, held every two years with Summer and Winter Olympic Games alternating. During Olympic Games closing ceremonies, the sitting president of the International Olympic Committee (IOC) received the flag from the current mayor of the current host city to the current mayor of the next host city. The current Olympic Charter requires this person to be the mayor of the next host city, although this has not always been the case. This article lists the people who have had the ceremonial duty to pass the Olympic flag from one to another for them to keep until the closing ceremony of each games.

Closing ceremony
The IOC factsheet on the closing ceremony states: "The mayors of the current host city and next host city join the IOC President. The mayor of the host city hands the flag to the IOC President, who hands it on to the mayor of the next host city." The Olympic Charter sets out the exact drill that the flag are to be handed by the mayor of the current host city to the another of the next host city. Three flags were used at the Summer Olympics, the first called the Antwerp flag that was used from 1920 to 1984 when it showed signs of wear. The second is called the Seoul flag that was used from 1988 to 2012. In 2016, the Seoul flag was replaced by the Rio flag, which symbolizes the first edition of the Games that was held in South America. In the Winter Games, the flag used is the PyeongChang flag, which was first used in 2018 to symbolize the first edition of the Winter Games held in mainland Asia. It replaced the Oslo flag that was used from 1952 to 2014. In some editions, a replica of it was used for conservation reasons. In the Summer Youth Olympic Games, the Singapore flag has been used since 2010, while in the Winter Youth Olympic Games, the Innsbruck flag is used. Also for conservation reasons, replicas are used.

With 5 years of keeping the Olympic flag for the 2020 Summer Olympics in Tokyo, Japan, governor Yuriko Koike is the longest keeper of the flag. With 2 years of keeping the Olympic flag for the 1994 Winter Olympics in Lillehammer, Norway, mayor Audun Tron is the shortest keeper of the flag.

Keeper of the Summer Olympic flag

Keepers of the Winter Olympic flag

Keepers of the Summer Youth Olympic flag

Keepers of the Winter Youth Olympic flag

See also
List of Olympic Games host cities
List of people who have opened the Olympic Games
President of the Organising Committee for the Olympic Games

References 

people
Olympic Games
Olympics closing ceremonies
Olympic